Nor Lípez is a province in the Bolivian department of Potosí. Its seat is Colcha "K", also called Villa Martín. The majority of the area of the province was titled as the Nor Lípez Native Community Land on 19 April 2011. One of the largest mines of  Bolivia, the San Cristóbal Mine, is located near San Cristóbal in Colcha "K" municipality.

Geography
Some of the highest mountains of the province are listed below:

Location
The province is one of sixteen provinces in the Potosí Department. It is located between 20° 27' and 22° 01' South and between 66° 18' and 68° 35' West.

It is bordered by the Daniel Campos Province to the north, the Republic of Chile to the west, the Enrique Baldivieso Province and Sur Lípez Province to the south, Sud Chichas Province to the east, and the Antonio Quijarro Province to the northeast.

The province extends over 270 km from east to west and 210 km from north to south.

Division
The province comprises two municipalities which are further subdivided into cantons.

Population
The population increased from 8,320 (1992 census) to 10,460 inhabitants (2001 census), an increase of 25,7%.

About 96% of the population have no access to electricity, 93% have no sanitary facilities. 61% of the population are employed in agriculture, 9% in mining, 2% in industry, 28% in general services. 90% of the population are Catholics, 6% are Protestants.

The people are predominantly indigenous citizens of Quechuan descent.

Languages 
The languages spoken in the province are mainly Spanish and Quechua.

Ref.: obd.descentralizacion.gov.bo

Places of interest 
 Cañapa Lake
 Chiguana Lake
 Laguna Hedionda
 Kara Lake
 Pastos Grandes Lake
 Sarapuru volcano
 Sonequera 
 Tapaquilcha

See also 
 Ch'iyar Quta
 Laqaya
 Puka Mayu

References

External links
Population data (Spanish)

Provinces of Potosí Department